{{Infobox airport
| name         = Toulouse Blagnac Airport
| nativename   = <small>Aéroport de Toulouse – Blagnac</small>
| image        = Aeroport_Toulouse_Blagnac.svg
| image-width  = 250
| image2       = Aérogare LFBO 2016.jpg
| image2-width = 250
| IATA         = TLS
| ICAO         = LFBO
| type         = Public
| owner        = City of Toulouse
| operator     = Chamber of Commerce and Industry of Toulouse
| city-served  = Toulouse Métropole
| location     = Blagnac, Haute-Garonne, France
| opened       = 
| focus_city   = 
| elevation-f  = 497
| website      = toulouse.aeroport.fr
| coordinates  = 
| pushpin_map            = France Occitanie#France
| pushpin_map_caption    = Location of airport in Occitanie region
| pushpin_label          = LFBO
| pushpin_label_position = bottom
| metric-rwy   = y
| r1-number    = 14R/32L
| r1-length-m  = 3,500
| r1-surface   = Asphalt concrete
| r2-number    = 14L/32R
| r2-length-m  = 3,000
| r2-surface   = Asphalt concrete
|stat-year    = 2017
|stat1-header = Passengers
|stat1-data   = 9,264,611
|stat2-header = Passenger traffic change 
|stat2-data   =  14.6%
|stat3-header = Aircraft movements 
|stat3-data   = 95,192
|stat4-header = Aircraft movements change
|stat4-data   =  2.2%
| footnotes    = Source: French AIPFrench AIP at EUROCONTROL<
}}

In 2017, the airport served 9,264,611 passengers. As of April 2017, the airport features flights to 74 destinations, mostly in Europe and Northern Africa with a few additional seasonal long-haul connections.

Both Airbus and ATR manufacture aircraft at nearby facilities and test them from the airport.

Facilities

Terminal
The airport consists of one passenger terminal divided into four halls which provide 68 counters and 34 gates on 100,000 sqm floor space:

Hall A features 14 check-in counters and eight aircraft stands for regional aircraft on domestic services.
Hall B is the oldest area, opened in 1978, and contains 16 check-in counters and 10 gates.
Hall C is equipped with 24 counters and 6 boarding gates for European destinations.
Hall D is the newest addition to the airport, opened in 2010, and is used for international and long-haul services with 14 check-in counters and 10 boarding gates.

Runways

A Concorde formerly operated by Air France with the registration F-BVFC is preserved at the Aeroscopia Museum near the airport. Airbus and ATR utilize runway 32L/14R for flight testing and delivery flights, while runway 32R/14L is used by commercial flights coming in to Toulouse (Airbus also uses this runway for formation flights). Also, the Airbus Delivery Center is on the runway 32L/14R side.

Ownership
Toulouse–Blagnac Airport SA is a limited liability company; the share capital is €148,000 and it has authority to operate the airport until 2046 under a franchise agreement awarded by the French government. The current CEO is Philippe Crébassa.

Airlines and destinations
Passenger

The following airlines operate regular scheduled and charter flights to and from Toulouse:

Cargo

Statistics

Access

Tram
Since April 2015, the T2 tram line connects Toulouse with the airport every 15 minutes. The tram connects with metro ligne A at Arènes and metro ligne B at Palais de Justice. It takes about 35 minutes with a change to go to the town center by tram.

Bus and coach
Shuttle buses to Toulouse city centre stop outside Hall B every 20 minutes. Faster than the tram, they take approximately 20 minutes to reach the city centre, stopping at Compans-Caffarelli and Jeanne d'Arc (both on Metro Line B), Jean Jaurès (Metro Line A and B) and at Toulouse-Matabiau railway station. Three daily coach services connect Toulouse–Blagnac Airport to Andorra, which does not have its own commercial airport.

Accidents and incidents
 On 29 January 1988, Inter Cargo Service Flight 1004, operated by Vickers Vanguard F-GEJF, crashed when takeoff was attempted with only three fully operable engines.
 On 30 June 1994, an Airbus A330-300 performing a test flight crashed shortly after takeoff, due to a series of mistakes while conducting a flight test simulating an engine failure. All seven people on board died in the accident.
 On 15 November 2007, a brand-new Airbus A340-600 due to be delivered to Etihad Airways ran up and over the top of a concrete sloped blast-deflection wall during an engine test at the Airbus factory at the airport. This was due to the crew not following proper test procedures, raising all four engines to maximum thrust while the wheels were un-chocked. The attempt to steer away from the wall resulted in decreased braking power. Five people were injured and the aircraft was written off.

See also
 List of the busiest airports in France
 Boeing Everett Factory (in Snohomish County Airport) — in Washington state, United States

 References 

 External links 

 Official website
 Aéroport de Toulouse – Blagnac (Union des Aéroports Français) 
 Radar Toulouse (Realtime flight tracker)
 
 
 LiveATC.net (Toulouse'')

Airports in Occitania (administrative region)
Transport in Toulouse
Buildings and structures in Haute-Garonne
Airports established in 1939
1939 establishments in France